Manu Paea (born 17 September 2001) is a New Zealand rugby union player who plays for  for the 2022 Super Rugby Pacific season. His playing position is scrum-half.

References

2001 births
New Zealand rugby union players
Living people
Rugby union scrum-halves
Moana Pasifika players
Tongan rugby union players
Tonga international rugby union players
Auckland rugby union players